Phenylalanyl-tRNA synthetase alpha chain is an enzyme that in humans is encoded by the FARSA gene.

Aminoacyl-tRNA synthetases are a class of enzymes that charge tRNAs with their cognate amino acids. This gene encodes a product which is similar to the catalytic subunit of prokaryotic and Saccharomyces cerevisiae phenylalanyl-tRNA synthetases (PheRS). This gene product has been shown to be expressed in a tumor-selective and cell cycle stage- and differentiation-dependent manner, the first member of the tRNA synthetase gene family shown to exhibit this type of regulated expression

References

Further reading